50 Great Voices is a NPR yearlong series from 2010 to 2011 to profile 50 singers who have made their mark internationally and across recorded history revealing the selected voices one by one about weekly.

Concept of the series
Source:
Discovery is a major part of this series.
What this project should do is look at artists who are great, but not as recognizable or as obvious a choice as Frank Sinatra.
In the very big world of music, discovery is a tricky thing.
Included in the 50 Great Voices are singers who are powerhouses within a genre, but not in the mainstream.
The 50 great voices series will both please and infuriate. And that's partly the point.
Whenever you come up with any kind of list, whether it's great athletes or great artists, there's bound to be controversy.

List of 50 great voices 
 47 great voices were released on-air, 3 great voices were released only on web-page.

References

External links 
 50 great voices NPR Special Series 2010

NPR